Ravina or Rabina may refer to:

People

Given name
 Two Jewish sages (amoraim) from the time of the gemara:
Ravina I (died 421)
Ravina II or Rabina II (fl. 5th century), nephew and successor of the above
Ravina (actress), Indian actress
Ravina Raj Kohli, Indian media executive
Ravina Oa (born 1995), Papua New Guinean cricketer
Rabina Khan (born 1972), Bangladeshi-born British writer and politician

Surname
Bernadette Ravina (born 1975), Mauritian javelin thrower
Bruno Ravina (born 1984), Mauritian footballer
Jean-Henri Ravina (1818–1906), French pianist, composer, and teacher
Mark Ravina (born 1961), American scholar of Japanese history
Oscar Ravina (1930–2010), Polish violinist, teacher, and concertmaster

Places
Rabina, Mostar, a village in Nevesinje, Republika Srpska, and in Mostar, Bosnia and Herzegovina
Rabina, Nevesinje, a village in Nevesinje, Republika Srpska, and in Mostar, Bosnia and Herzegovina
Ravina (Lordville, New York), a historic district listed on the U.S. National Register of Historic Places

Other uses
Ravina Project Toronto, a Canadian climate change research project
Toronto Ravinas, Canadian Professional Hockey League team 1927–1928

See also
Mar son of Ravina (fl. 3rd century), Babylonian Jewish rabbi
Ravine (disambiguation)
Ravinia (disambiguation)
Ravna (disambiguation)